Ivar Skontorp Peersen, best known by his stage name Ivar Bjørnson (born 27 November 1977 in Etne), is a Norwegian composer/guitarist for the progressive black/viking metal band Enslaved.

Biography 
Bjørnson is, along with Grutle Kjellson, one of only two founding members left in the current line-up of Enslaved, being only 13 years old at the time of the band's formation in 1991. Bjørnson and Grutle Kjellson performed in a death metal band called Phobia in 1989. The two decided that they wanted to form a new band in a more black metal style, and after discovering their shared fascination with Norse mythology, this set the groundwork for Enslaved. Beyond his duties on guitar, he writes almost all of the music for Enslaved as well as much of the lyrics. He has said that "When we started Enslaved we wanted to have the same level of commitment to something spiritual as our contemporaries in black metal [have with] the Satanic side. The dark destructive part of black metal didn't seem right because we didn't have any commitment to any Satanic ideology." He contributed keyboard/synth work to Borknagar's first three albums and synth/piano work on the Gorgoroth albums Incipit Satan and Destroyer under the name "Daimonion"; and also produced the first demo from black metal band Orcustus.

In 2011, Metalsucks named him the 22nd best modern metal guitarist, writing that "Ivar Bjørnson pushed the boundaries of black metal so far that they’re in the blurry distance, only recognizable to those looking for them." He has frequently cited Pink Floyd, Motorpsycho, and progressive rock as major influences on his songwriting, and has called Pink Floyd his favourite band.

In 2014, the Norwegian government commissioned Ivar and Einar Selvik (Wardruna) to create a musical piece in celebration of the 200th anniversary of the Norwegian constitution. The arrangement was titled 'Skuggsjá', and was performed by Enslaved and Wardruna as a concert piece at the Eidsivablot festival in Eidsvoll, Norway on 13 September 2014. The music drew on the history, culture, and language of Norway and its Norse tradition, intended to tell the story of Norway, and to contextualise the past in Norway's present. The pair later decided that the project should be expanded upon, and further shows followed, including one at the popular Roadburn festival in 2015. They used the project's name and released the project as a full-length studio album on 11 March 2016.

References

External links 
 Enslaved's official website

Norwegian black metal musicians
Norwegian rock guitarists
Norwegian heavy metal guitarists
Norwegian multi-instrumentalists
1977 births
Living people
Place of birth missing (living people)
Enslaved (band) members
Gorgoroth members
Borknagar members
People from Etne